Sir Charles Mansfield Tobias Clarke, 6th Baronet (8 September 1939 – 16 September 2019), known as Sir Toby Clarke since 1973, was a British businessman.

Clarke was the son of Sir Humphrey Clarke, 5th Baronet and was educated at Eton, Christ Church, Oxford, La Sorbonne, and New York University. He founded The Baronets' Journal in 1987 and from 1993 to 1996 he was chairman of the Standing Council of the Baronetage
Bankers Trust Co. He was associate director of Swiss Bank Corp. in 1992–94, underwriting member, Lloyds from 1984 to 2001, and lord of the Manor of Bibury.

Through his grandmother, Elfrida Roosevelt (Lady Clarke, wife of Sir Orme Bigland Clarke, Bt, CBE), he was related to U.S. President Theodore Roosevelt. President Roosevelt was his first cousin, three times removed. He was also the second cousin, three times removed to President Franklin D. Roosevelt.

He was married to Charlotte Walter and then Teresa Loraine Aphrodite de Chair (daughter of Somerset de Chair) (divorced). He has three children (by his second marriage): Theodora Roosevelt Clarke, Augusta Elfrida Clarke, and Olympic athlete Lawrence Somerset Clarke.

He was a Vice-President of the Standing Council of the Baronetage.

Clarke died on 16 September 2019, eight days after celebrating his 80th birthday.

See also
 Clarke of Dunham Lodge, Norfolk

References

Sources
thePeerage.com

 Who's Who 2008

1939 births
2019 deaths
Alumni of Christ Church, Oxford
University of Paris alumni
Baronets in the Baronetage of the United Kingdom
People educated at Eton College
English people of American descent
Roosevelt family
British expatriates in the United States
New York University alumni
British expatriates in France
Clarke baronets